Codex of Bécs (Vienna Codex) is a collection of the earliest available Hungarian translations of the Bible. It is a part of the Hussite Bible from the 15th century. A third of it is written with bastarda writing. It is located at the National Széchenyi Library, Budapest, Hungary.

Content
Codex includes the translation of the following books: Ruth, Judith, Ester, Second Book of Maccabees, Baruch, Daniel and the Twelve Minor Prophets.

External links
BÉCSI-KÓDEX | Magyar Nyelvemlékek 
Bécsi-kódex – Magyar Katolikus Lexikon 
Bécsi-kódex - Lexikon :: - Kislexikon 
The text of the Vienna Codex in its original orthographic form along with its Modern Hungarian counterpart is available and searchable in the Old Hungarian Corpus.

Hungarian books
Hungarian chronicles
15th-century literature
Gothic art
Hungarian literature